Possum Trot is an unincorporated community in Marshall County, Kentucky, United States. Possum Trot is located on Highway 62 between Paducah and Calvert City in the Jackson Purchase region of Western Kentucky.

Possum Trot has been noted for its unusual place name.

Notable People

Robert H. Grubbs, ForMemRS (February 27, 1942 – December 19, 2021) was an American chemist and the Victor and Elizabeth Atkins Professor of Chemistry at the California Institute of Technology in Pasadena, California. He was a co-recipient of the 2005 Nobel Prize in Chemistry for his work on olefin metathesis.

References

Unincorporated communities in Kentucky
Unincorporated communities in Marshall County, Kentucky